Ōta Station is the name of two train stations in Japan.

 Ōta Station (Gunma) - (太田駅) in Ota, Gunma Prefecture
 Ōta Station (Kagawa) - (太田駅) in Takamatsu, Kagawa Prefecture